Hsia Te-yu is a Taiwanese nuclear engineer who led the Atomic Energy Council from May 2000 to March 2001.

Career
Hsia earned a Ph.D in nuclear engineering from the Massachusetts Institute of Technology, and had worked for the Atomic Energy Council for over a decade prior to accepting an appointment to lead the AEC. At the time of his promotion, Hsia was head researcher at the AEC's Institute of Nuclear Energy Research. Hsia, a Kuomintang member, took office with the Tang Fei minority cabinet on 20 May 2000. He was supportive of the use of nuclear energy, though many others in the Executive Yuan were not. Much of Hsia's tenure was spent discussing the status of the Lungmen Nuclear Power Plant. In March 2001, Hsia left office and was succeeded by Hu Chin-piao.

References

Taiwanese nuclear engineers
Living people
Year of birth missing (living people)
Place of birth missing (living people)
Kuomintang politicians in Taiwan
Government ministers of Taiwan